Donovan's Brain is an independently made 1953 black-and-white science fiction horror film, produced by Allan Dowling and Tom Gries, directed by Felix E. Feist, that stars Lew Ayres and Nancy Davis. The film was distributed by United Artists and is based on the 1942 horror novel Donovan's Brain by Curt Siodmak.

The story involves an attempt to keep alive the brain of millionaire megalomaniac W.H. Donovan after an otherwise fatal plane crash. The brain has other ideas and begins to possess people.

Plot
Dr. Patrick Cory and his wife Janice live in a mountain retreat where Cory attempts to keep a monkey's brain alive after having been removed from the monkey's skull.

The private plane of businessman Warren Donovan crashes near Cory's cabin, and rescuers request Cory's help. Donovan is seriously injured and not expected to live, so Cory takes the businessman's brain for experimentation. Cory manages to keep the brain alive in an electrified saline solution. After writing messages in Donovan's handwriting while he is sleeping, Cory believes Donovan's consciousness still survives and he attempts to communicate with the brain.

Gradually, Cory begins to exhibit Donovan's personality traits such as smoking cigars, using ruthless personal manipulation, and walking with a limp. Janice and Frank Schratt, Cory's friend and assistant, suspect that Donovan's consciousness is using telepathic mind control to overpower Cory's free will. In the meantime, news photographer Yocum discovers that Cory has illegally stolen Donovan's brain and demands money to keep the secret.

Donovan's brain grows increasingly powerful, using Cory to collect a financial fortune and taking control of Yocum's mind and forcing him into a fatal car crash. After realizing that Donovan can control only one person at a time, Janice and Frank plot to destroy the brain. However, Frank's plan goes wrong when Donovan forces Frank to shoot himself. Ultimately, lightning strikes the Cory home and a fire breaks out, burning Donovan's brain and bringing an end to the horror. Frank survives, and Cory willingly goes to accept the consequences for his actions.

Cast
 Lew Ayres as Dr. Patrick Cory
 Nancy Davis as Janice Cory
 Gene Evans as Dr. Frank Schratt
 Steve Brodie as Yocum
 Tom Powers as Donovan's Washington Advisor
 Lisa Howard as Chloe Donovan (credited as Lisa K. Howard)
 James Anderson as Chief Tuttle (credited as Kyle James)
 Victor Sutherland as Nathaniel Fuller
 Michael Colgan as Tom Donovan
 Peter Adams as Mr. Webster
 Harlan Warde as Treasury Agent Brooke
 Shimen Ruskin as Tailor

See also
The Lady and the Monster (1944), an earlier film adaptation of the novel
The Brain (1962), a later film adaptation of the novel
The Brain That Wouldn't Die (1962)
The Man with Two Brains (1983). Dr. Hfuhruhurr, played by Steve Martin, mentions Donovan's Brain is his favorite movie.

References

External links

 
 
 
 

1953 films
1953 horror films
1950s science fiction horror films
American science fiction horror films
American black-and-white films
Mad scientist films
Films based on horror novels
Films based on American novels
Films directed by Felix E. Feist
1950s English-language films
1950s American films